Cole Schneider (born August 26, 1990) is an American professional ice hockey player who currently plays with the Milwaukee Admirals in the American Hockey League (AHL). After leaving the University of Connecticut in 2012, he began his professional career with the Binghamton Senators of the American Hockey League (AHL).

Playing career
Schneider attended the University of Connecticut, where he played two seasons of college hockey under Bruce Marshall, with the NCAA Division I Huskies. In his freshman year, Schneider was selected to the All-AHA Rookie Team, and in his sophomore year his outstanding play was rewarded with a selection to the 2011–12 All-AHA First Team. Schneider posted 23 goals and 45 points in his sophomore season — both school records — and he became just the third University of Connecticut product to sign an NHL contract.

On March 14, 2012, the Ottawa Senators signed Schneider as a free agent to a two-year entry-level contract. Shortly after signing with Ottawa, Schneider made his professional debut with the American Hockey League's Binghamton Senators and subsequently recorded two assists in 11 games to close out the 2011–12 season.

On February 27, 2016, Schneider was traded by the Senators to the Buffalo Sabres as part of a seven-player deal. He spent the remainder of the season with the AHL's Rochester Americans before being called up by the Sabres and making his NHL debut on April 8, 2016.

On July 1, 2017, having left the Sabres as a free agent, Schneider agreed to a two-year, two-way contract with the New York Rangers. He was named the captain of the Hartford Wolf Pack ahead of the 2018–19 season. Schneider was second among the Wolf Pack in scoring with 25 points in 36 games, before he was traded by the Rangers to the Nashville Predators in exchange for Connor Brickley on January 14, 2019. He was immediately reassigned to continue in the AHL with the Milwaukee Admirals. Schneider adapted quickly with the Admirals, posting 22 points in the final 24 regular season games.

As a free agent, Schneider opted to remain with the Milwaukee Admirals, agreeing to a one-year AHL contract on July 2, 2019. In his second year with Milwaukee, Schneider placed second on the team in scoring with 18 goals and 46 points through 54 regular season games before the 2019–20 season was cancelled due to the COVID-19 pandemic.

With the Admirals opting out of play for the pandemic delayed 2020–21 season, Schneider as a free agent agreed to a one-year AHL contract with the Texas Stars, affiliate of the Dallas Stars, on January 23, 2021. He was named the Stars' team captain on February 4, 2021. Schneider finished third in team scoring posting 11 goals and 28 points through 38 regular season games.

On July 7, 2021, Schneider returned to the Milwaukee Admirals, agreeing to a one-year contract for the 2021–22 season.

Career statistics

Awards and honors

References

External links

1990 births
Living people
American men's ice hockey forwards
Binghamton Senators players
Buffalo Sabres players
UConn Huskies men's ice hockey players
Hartford Wolf Pack players
Ice hockey players from New York (state)
Milwaukee Admirals players
People from Williamsville, New York
Rochester Americans players
St. Joseph's Collegiate Institute alumni
Texas Stars players
Undrafted National Hockey League players